Lawrence Gray (July 28, 1898 – February 2, 1970) was an American actor of the 1920s and 1930s.

Biography
Born in San Francisco in 1898, Gray served during World War I in the U.S. Navy and gained a commission. After the war, he began in the technical side of films at the Lasky Studios, but later became an extra in crowd scenes and such, and liking the work, decided on a film career. He appeared in over 40 films between 1925 and 1936, although many were B movies.

In 1930, he starred in the Metro-Goldwyn-Mayer film musical Children of Pleasure, alongside Wynne Gibson, and was also involved with the film score. That same year he also starred in the Vitaphone film musicals Sunny and Spring is Here. He spent much of his career in vaudeville. 

He died on February 2, 1970, aged 71, in 1970 in Mexico City.

Selected filmography

 The Dressmaker from Paris (1925)
 The Coast of Folly (1925)
 Stage Struck (1925)
 Are Parents People? (1925)
 The American Venus (1926)
 The Palm Beach Girl (1926)
 The Untamed Lady (1926)
 Love 'Em and Leave 'Em (1926)
 Kid Boots (1926)
 The Telephone Girl (1927)
 After Midnight (1927)
 The Callahans and the Murphys (1927)
 Convoy (1927)
 Pajamas (1927)
 Diamond Handcuffs (1928)
 Domestic Meddlers (1928)
 Marriage by Contract (1928)
 Love Hungry (1928)
 The Patsy (1928)
 Shadows of the Night (1928)
 It's a Great Life (1929)
 Trent's Last Case (1929)
 The Rainbow (1929)
 Marianne (1929)
 Sunny (1930)
 Spring is Here (1930)
 The Florodora Girl (1930)
 Man of the World (1931)
 Dizzy Dames (1935)
 Danger Ahead (1935)
 Timber War'' (1935)

External links and sources

American male film actors
American male stage actors
1898 births
1970 deaths
20th-century American male actors
United States Navy personnel of World War I